Steve Carra is an American far right politician serving as a member of the Michigan House of Representatives from the 59th district. Elected in November 2020, he assumed office on January 1, 2021.

Early life and education 
Carra was born and raised in Southwest Michigan. After graduating from Portage Northern High School, Carra earned a Bachelor of Arts degree in economics and political science from Western Michigan University.

Career 
For three years, Carra worked in the office of State Representative Steve Johnson. He was also a research assistant at the Acton Institute.

Carra won election to the Michigan House in the 2020 elections. Former President Donald Trump endorsed Carra in the Republican primary, calling incumbent U.S. Representative Fred Upton a "RINO."

On October 10, 2021, Carra introduced House Bill 5444 also known as the "fetal heartbeat protection act."

In June 2022, Carra introduced a resolution calling for the 2021 United States Capitol attack to be named as "Remembrance Day," characterizing the event as a response to "unconstitutional mandates, government intrusion and power grabs by political elitists."

References

External links

Living people
Republican Party members of the Michigan House of Representatives
Western Michigan University alumni
Year of birth missing (living people)

Far-right politicians in the United States
American nationalists
American conspiracy theorists